is a Japanese actress. Her former stage name was Mimula. She is best known for her performance as Kyoko Okudera in One Missed Call 2.

Filmography

Films
One Missed Call 2 (2005)
Tengoku Kara no Yell (2011) – Michiko Oshiro
Chronicle of My Mother (2012) – Ikuko
Black Widow Business (2016)
Close-Knit (2017) – Hiromi
Parallel World Love Story (2019)
Living in the Sky (2020)

Television
 Gō (2011) – Hosokawa Gracia
 Totto TV (2016) – Kuniko Mukōda
 Segodon (2018) – Ōkubo Masu
 Shiroi Kyotō (2019) – Kimiko Kameyama
 Yuganda Hamon (2019)
 The Yagyu Conspiracy (2020) – Ofuku
 Reach Beyond the Blue Sky (2021) – Tokushin-in
 The Grand Family (2021) – Ichiko Mima

References

External links
 Official profile 
 

1984 births
Living people
Actors from Saitama Prefecture
Japanese film actresses
Japanese television actresses